The Seiko Super Tennis Hong Kong, also known as the 1985 Hong Kong Open, was a men's tennis tournament played on indoor hard courts at the Victoria Park Tennis Centre in Hong Kong that was part of the 1985 Nabisco Grand Prix tennis ciruit. It was the 13th edition of the tournament and was held from 18 November through 24 November 1985. Third-seeded Andrés Gómez won the singles title.

Finals

Singles
 Andrés Gómez defeated  Aaron Krickstein 6–3, 6–3, 3–6, 6–4
 It was Gómez' only singles title of the year and the 10th of his career.

Doubles
 Brad Drewett /  Kim Warwick defeated  Jakob Hlasek /  Tomáš Šmíd 3–6, 6–4, 6–2

References

External links
 ITF tournament edition details

Seiko Super Tennis Hong Kong
Hong Kong Open (tennis)
1985 in Hong Kong sport